Chain of Fools is a 2000 American heist comedy film directed by Swedish production collective Traktor. It stars Steve Zahn, Salma Hayek, Elijah Wood, David Cross, Tom Wilkinson, David Hyde Pierce, Lara Flynn Boyle, and  Jeff Goldblum. Chain of Fools was scheduled for release in the United States by Warner Bros. Pictures in the fall of 2000, but it ended up only being theatrically released in Sweden on March 3, 2001. After further delays, the film was released straight to video in the US on February 15, 2005.

Plot

Thomas Kresk is a loser—he isn't good at his job, he's been tossed out of his home, and his wife just dumped him for the marriage counselor. On top of all that, his longtime friend and mentor Gordon Freeman died tragically. Now he's depressed, and contemplating suicide. And yes, things get worse: a criminal named Avnet (Jeff Goldblum) has stolen three priceless coins, and decided to blackmail Bollingsworth (Tom Wilkinson), his billionaire partner in crime. After Kresk overhears this, he almost gets shot—and Avnet ends up impaled on a pair of barbers' scissors.

Now Kresk is in a considerably nastier situation, so he steals the gun and the coins. But things take a sharp turn when he hires a hit man named Mikey (Elijah Wood), and discovers that the hit man is only seventeen and emotionally traumatized by his parents' suicide. And that Kresk is falling for the cop/Playboy model Sgt. Meredith Kolko (Salma Hayek), and that his nephew Scottie (Devin Drewitz) has now swallowed the coins. Now Kresk is in over his head, and has to deal with the strange and sometimes dangerous people around him.

Cast

Production

The primary filming location was Vancouver, British Columbia, Canada.

Release
Chain of Fools premiered in Sweden on March 3, 2001. The film was scheduled for a US release by Warner Bros. Pictures in the fall of 2000, but this never happened. It was then shelved for five years before finally being released on DVD on February 15, 2005.

Critical reception

Variety said the film is "uneven but shows definite signs of promise."

References

External links
 
 
 
 

2001 films
2001 comedy films
American black comedy films
American heist films
Films scored by John Murphy (composer)
Warner Bros. films
2000s English-language films
2000s American films